Tritones may refer to:
 Tritones (mythology)
 Triton (mythology)
 Daimones of the sea, see daemon (classical mythology)

See also 
 Tritone (disambiguation)
 Tritons, several
 Triton (disambiguation)
 Tritonia (disambiguation)